Walter Jakob Gehring (20 March 1939 – 29 May 2014) was a Swiss developmental biologist who was a professor at the Biozentrum Basel of the University of Basel, Switzerland. He obtained his PhD at the University of Zurich in 1965 and after two years as a research assistant of Ernst Hadorn he joined Alan Garen's group at Yale University in New Haven as a postdoctoral fellow.

In 1969 he was appointed associate professor at Yale Medical School and 1972  returned to Switzerland to become a professor of developmental biology and genetics at the Biozentrum of the University of Basel. He was Secretary General of the European Molecular Biology Organization, President of the International Society of Developmental Biologists, and  Foreign Member of the national academies of  the USA, Great Britain, France, Germany and Sweden.

Gehring was mainly involved in studies of Drosophila genetics and development, particularly in the analysis of cell determination in the embryo and transdetermination of imaginal discs. He performed studies of the heat shock genes, various transposons, and the homeotic genes which are involved in the genetic control of development.

In 1983 Gehring and his collaborators (William McGinnis, Michael S. Levine, Ernst Hafen, Richard Garber, Atsushi Kuroiwa, Johannes Wirz), discovered the homeobox, a DNA segment characteristic for homeotic genes which is not only present in arthropods and their ancestors, but also in vertebrates including man.

Gehring was also involved in the development and application of enhancer trapping methods. He and his collaborators identified PAX6 as a master control gene for eye development, which led to a new theory about the monophyletic origin of the eyes in evolution.

Awards
 1987 Gairdner Foundation International Award
 1987 Louis-Jeantet Prize for Medicine
 1996 Awarded the Otto Warburg Medal
 1997 Awarded the March of Dimes Prize in Developmental Biology. 
 2000 Received the Kyoto Prize for Basic Science. 
 2001 Alfred Vogt-Preis
 2002 Received the Balzan Prize for Developmental Biology.
 2003 A.O. Kovalevsky Medal

References

Further reading
 

1939 births
2014 deaths
People associated with the University of Zurich
Kyoto laureates in Basic Sciences
Members of the French Academy of Sciences
Members of the Royal Swedish Academy of Sciences
Members of the European Molecular Biology Organization
Foreign Members of the Royal Society
Foreign associates of the National Academy of Sciences
Knights Commander of the Order of Merit of the Federal Republic of Germany
Recipients of the Pour le Mérite (civil class)
Biozentrum University of Basel
Embryologists